The 1998 IIHF Asian Oceanic Junior U18 Championship was the 15th edition of the IIHF Asian Oceanic Junior U18 Championship. It took place between 15 and 21 March 1998 in Harbin, China. The tournament was won by South Korea, who claimed their first title by finishing first in the standings. Japan and China finished second and third respectively.

Overview
The 1998 IIHF Asian Oceanic Junior U18 Championship began on 15 March 1998 in Harbin, China. The under-18 teams of New Zealand and Thailand made their debut appearance at the Championships and in international competition. South Korea won the tournament after winning four of their five games and drawing their game against Japan. South Korea won their first title having previously finished second on four other occasions. Japan finished second behind South Korea on goal difference and China finished third after losing to South Korea and Japan. Thailand who finished last also suffered the largest defeat of the tournament against South Korea, losing 0 – 92.

Song Dong-hwan of South Korea finished as the top scorer for the tournament with 56 points including 44 goals and 12 assists.

Standings

Fixtures
Reference

References

External links
International Ice Hockey Federation

IIHF Asian Oceanic U18 Championship
IIHF Asian Oceanic U18 Championships
Asian
International ice hockey competitions hosted by China